Daniel Rosenbaum (born February 11, 1997) is an American-Israeli basketball player for Maccabi Ironi Ramat Gan in the Israeli National League. He plays the guard position.

Biography
Rosenbaum is 195 cm (6' 5") tall.

He was born in Los Altos Hills, California. Rosenbaum attended Los Altos High School ('15). His brother Simon Rosenbaum is a baseball player for the Israel National Baseball Team.  He played for the Eagles basketball team, and was All-League First-Team, All-Daily News First-Team, and All-Mercury News Second-Team.

Rosenbaum attended Pomona College majoring in Computer Science, and played for the Pomona-Pitzer Sagehens ('19). In 2015-16 he averaged 16.4 points, 4.6 rebounds, and 1.8 assists per game.  In 2016-17 he averaged 14.7 points per game and was Second Team All-Southern California Intercollegiate Athletic Conference.  In 2017-18 he averaged 15.6 points, 6.9 rebounds, and 2.0 assists per game, and was First Team All-SCIAC. In 2019 he averaged 18.9 points and 5.9 rebounds per game. He was voted to the 2019 Google Cloud Academic All-America Team for men's basketball selected by the College Sports Information Directors of America (College Sports Information Directors of America), the 2019 SCIAC Athlete of the Year and First Team All-SCIAC, First Team All-West Region, and a First Team All-West Region selection by the National Association of Basketball Coaches. 

Rosenbaum plays for Maccabi Ironi Ramat Gan in the Israeli National League.

References

Hapoel Jerusalem B.C. players

1997 births
Living people
American expatriate basketball people in Israel
American men's basketball players
Basketball players from California
People from Los Altos Hills, California
Pomona College alumni